Raunds Co-operative Society Limited was a consumer co-operative society based in Raunds, Northamptonshire, founded in 1891.

The society operated a large supermarket and a department store in Raunds, and as of 2007 held  of farmland at Northdale Farm, farming wheat and oilseed rape. 
It had 4,297 members in 2003.
It was a subscriber to the Co-operative Party and a customer member (shareholder) of the Co-operative Wholesale Society.

In 1983, it merged with the Ringstead Distributive Co-operative Society.

In early 2007, directors of the society presented to members a plan to merge with the much large Midlands Co-operative Society, 
but it did not reach the required vote of two thirds of members when put to a special general meeting on 5 July 2007. 
However, a confirmatory meeting was held on 16 August and this time the vote to merge was carried. 
The two societies merged on 26 August 2007.

See also 
Co-op
Co-op UK
The Co-operative Group

References

Former co-operatives of the United Kingdom
Defunct retail companies of the United Kingdom
Companies based in Northamptonshire
Consumers' co-operatives of the United Kingdom
Retail companies established in 1891
Retail companies disestablished in 2007
Defunct department stores of the United Kingdom
1891 establishments in England
2007 disestablishments in England
Raunds